Taleb Khan (also Romanized as Ţāleb Khān and Ţālebkhān) is a village in Sarajuy-ye Gharbi Rural District of the Central District of Maragheh County, East Azerbaijan province, Iran. At the 2006 National Census, its population was 1,632 in 430 households. The following census in 2011 counted 2,280 people in 663 households. The latest census in 2016 showed a population of 2,848 people in 844 households; it was the largest village in its rural district.

References 

Maragheh County

Populated places in East Azerbaijan Province

Populated places in Maragheh County